The 1978 FIVB Men's World Championship was the ninth edition of the tournament, organised by the world's governing body, the FIVB. It was held from 20 September 1 to October 1978 in Italy.

Qualification

* Yugoslavia and Puerto Rico withdrew and were replaced by Finland and United States.

Venues

Teams

Group A
 
 
 
 

Group B
 
 
 
 

Group C
 
 
 
 

Group D
 
 
 
 

Group E
 
 
 
 

Group F

Results

First round

Pool A
Location: Rome

|}

|}

Pool B
Location: Bergamo

|}

|}

Pool C
Location: Udine

|}

|}

Pool D
Location: Venice

|}

|}

Pool E
Location: Parma

|}

|}

Pool F
Location: Ancona

|}

|}

Second round
The results and the points of the matches between the same teams that were already played during the first round are taken into account for the second round.

1st–12th pools

Pool G
Location: Rome

|}

|}

Pool H
Location: Rome

|}

|}

13th–24th pools

Pool I
Location: Venice

|}

|}

Pool J
Location: Venice

|}

|}

Final round

21st–24th places

21st–24th semifinals

|}

23rd place match

|}

21st place match

|}

17th–20th places

17th–20th semifinals

|}

19th place match

|}

17th place match

|}

13th–16th places

13th–16th semifinals

|}

15th place match

|}

13th place match

|}

9th–12th places

9th–12th semifinals

|}

11th place match

|}

9th place match

|}

5th–8th places

5th–8th semifinals

|}

7th place match

|}

5th place match

|}

Finals

Semifinals

|}

3rd place match

|}

Final

|}

Final standing

External links
 Federation Internationale de Volleyball

W
V
V
VWC 1978 Men
FIVB Volleyball Men's World Championship
FIVB Volleyball Men's World Championship
FIVB Volleyball Men's World Championship
1970s in Rome
Sports competitions in Rome